Faraz Waqar (born 21 January 1976) is a Pakistani filmmaker, writer and director of Pakistan's first ever silent film Meeoww Billi aur World War 3, completed in September 2013. He is also the winner as an emerging new Director of Pakistan's prestigious HUM TV Awards in 2015 for the Best Short Film - Middle East. Faraz's latest work includes OTHER-ISTAN - The other face of Pakistan completed in 2016.

The era of silent films was already over by the time of the independence of Pakistan in 1947. The new country inherited a film industry from the days of the British Raj (based mainly in the city of Lahore) that had already been producing 'talkies' or sound films since the 1930s. The Pakistani film industry (also known today as Lollywood) therefore did not produce any silent films till the year 2013 when Waqar completed his film Meeoww Billi aur World War 3. The film is an artistic experiment inspired by the era of silent cinema and carries a political message. It is regarded as the first ever silent film in the history of cinema in Pakistan.

Career
A native of Karachi, Waqar has been an active filmmaker since the year 2012. His first film 9:11 am was one of the only two Pakistani films showcased at the Cannes Film Festival in 2012 in France. The film 9:11 am was also part of the Official Selection in the year 2012 at the Mosaic International South Asian Film Festival of Mississauga (MISAFF) in Canada and the Gandhara Film Festival in Pakistan.

In August 2013, Waqar produced and directed an experimental music film tribute to Pakistan's and the sub-continent's pop music singer Nazia Hassan. The video, titled Imagineer, was released on the thirteenth anniversary of her death. It highlighted Hassan's contribution to South Asian pop and Bollywood film music.

Waqar completed Pakistan's first silent film titled Meeoww Billi aur World War 3 in September 2013. The film is an artistic experiment inspired by the age of silent cinema of the 1920s with a global political message about the Middle East. Meeoww Billi aur World War 3 has been selected for screening at international film festivals in 2013–2014.

Faraz was recognized as an emerging new Director at the prestigious HUM TV Awards in 2015 in the category of Best Short Films - Middle East. His latest film completed in 2016 is titled OTHER-ISTAN - The other face of Pakistan that is to be screened at international film festivals this year.

With his previous background and experience in Brand Marketing, Waqar has in the past been closely involved with the development of commercial television, radio and print advertising for major international and Pakistani brands. In 2002, Waqar was part of the Brand Marketing team responsible for conceptualizing, producing and directing the first Lux Style Awards for Unilever in Pakistan. The Lux Style Awards is today considered one of Pakistan's premier annual award show events.

Filmography

Early life and education
Faraz Waqar was born into a Muslim family in Karachi, Pakistan. He was brought up and educated in the city of Karachi. Faraz received his Master's in Business Administration from the Institute of Business Administration (IBA) in Karachi, Pakistan in 1998. He worked as a Brand and Marketing Manager for major multinational corporations and banks in Pakistan, Saudi Arabia, and Qatar from 1999 to 2011. In 2012, Faraz graduated from the New York Film Academy with a 1-year diploma in film-making from the academy's Middle East campus located in Abu Dhabi,  United Arab Emirates (UAE).

Personal life
Waqar is the son of (late) Syed Waqar Ali and artist/interior designer Naheed Waqar. He has two siblings, a younger sister Rida Waqar who is an architect and a younger brother Adnan Waqar who is a banker. Faraz currently resides in Dubai in the United Arab Emirates.

Sources 

     http://www.thenational.ae/arts-lifestyle/film/abu-dhabi-based-faraz-waqar-on-winning-hum-tv-short-filmvideo-award
     https://www.youtube.com/watch?v=iVDGoKBtOQI
     http://www.thenational.ae/arts-culture/film/faraz-waqar-is-finding-his-voice-in-abu-dhabi
     https://web.archive.org/web/20131213235830/http://www.luxstyle.pk/celebrity-news/?pakistans-1st-silent-film-meoww-billi-aur-world-war-3
     https://www.youtube.com/watch?v=iVDGoKBtOQI
     http://www.filmfareme.com/silence-speaks/
     http://www.oyetimes.com/lifestyle/arts-culture/65259-uae-s-capital-abu-dhabi-fast-becoming-the-global-hub-of-choice-for-new-filmmakers
     http://shemagazine.ca/features/pakistani-filmmaker-faraz-waqar-socially-conscious-visionary/    
     http://tribune.com.pk/story/611929/did-you-know-first-pakistani-silent-movie-makes-it-to-international-film-fests/
     https://web.archive.org/web/20140201172327/http://archives.dailytimes.com.pk/infotainment/01-Oct-2013/pak-s-1st-silent-picture-film-to-be-submitted-to-int-l-film-festivals
     http://www.dailytimes.com.pk/default.asp?page=2013\10\01\story_1-10-2013_pg9_10
     http://www.oyetimes.com/cinema/previews/51407-pakistan-s-1st-silent-film-sent-to-international-film-festivals-filmmaker-faraz-waqar
     http://www.fashioncentral.pk/blog/2013/10/01/pakistans-1st-silent-picture-film-to-be-submitted-to-international-film-festivals/#.UnIWkM3ba-v
     https://vimeo.com/75716942
     https://www.youtube.com/watch?v=bdZojs2J3FM
     https://web.archive.org/web/20140201171451/http://dailymailnews.com/2013/10/31/lollywoods-1st-silent-film-to-reach-intl-film-fests/
     http://www.brandsynario.com/news/pakistans-1st-silent-film-meeeowww-billi-aur-world-war-3-to-mesmerize-lahor
     http://www.pakimag.com/showbiz/pakistans-1st-silent-picture-film-by-faraz-waqar.html
     http://www.lollywoodonline.com/2013/10/did-you-know-first-pakistani-silent.html
     http://lahore.newspakistan.pk/2013/10/01/did-you-know-first-pakistani-silent-movie-makes-it-to-international-film-fests/
     http://www.dailymotion.com/video/x131ty0_film-on-nazia-hasan-13-aug-2013_news
     http://dawn.com/news/1035119/tribute-to-nazia-hasan
     https://web.archive.org/web/20140201200833/http://archives.dailytimes.com.pk/infotainment/22-Jul-2013/pakistani-filmmaker-to-give-tribute-to-nazia-hassan-on-13th-death-anniversary
     http://www.dailytimes.com.pk/default.asp?page=2013\07\22\story_22-7-2013_pg9_12
     http://tribune.com.pk/story/589176/imagineer-a-tribute-to-a-pop-legend/
     http://www.pakistantoday.com.pk/2013/07/23/news/entertainment/a-toast-to-the-queen-of-pop-faraz-wakars-musical-tribute-to-nazia-hasan/
     http://www.oyetimes.com/news/pakistan/47402-faraz-waqar-film-tribute-to-nazia-hasan
     http://www.fashioncentral.pk/blog/2013/07/29/a-personal-tribute-by-a-pakistani-filmmaker-to-nazia-hassan-south-asias-1st-pop-music-legend-on-her-13th-death-anniversay/#.UnIaI83ba-s
     https://vimeo.com/71483249
     https://www.youtube.com/watch?v=izHnYVV9Y4s
     https://www.youtube.com/watch?v=qLbROcIxsAk
     https://www.youtube.com/watch?v=gEcpBCtPc0w
     https://www.youtube.com/watch?v=WEhO9VZAuNw
     http://tribune.com.pk/story/381653/tete-a-tete-with-faraz-waqar/
     http://paktribune.com/news/911-am-%E2%80%93-Pakistani-filmmaking-graduates-journey-to-Cannes-Film-Festival-249095.html
     https://web.archive.org/web/20140201201226/http://archives.dailytimes.com.pk/infotainment/13-Apr-2012/9-11-am-pakistani-filmmaking-graduate-s-journey-to-cannes-film-festival
     http://www.dailytimes.com.pk/default.asp?page=2012%5C04%5C13%5Cstory_13-4-2012_pg9_12
     http://www.oyetimes.com/news/pakistan/24481-pakistani-short-film-9-11-am-wins-kudos-at-cannes-film-festival
     http://www.nyfa.edu/film-school-blog/one-graduates-journey-to-the-cannes-film-festival/
     http://www.dawn.com/news/752946/festival-ends-heer-ranjha-gets-best-feature-film-award
     https://vimeo.com/69917255
     https://www.youtube.com/watch?v=7YKkjT3i5mc
     https://vimeo.com/69918075

External links
 https://www.imdb.com/name/nm4546110/
 http://www.khwaabfactoryfilms.com/

Living people
Pakistani television directors
Pakistani television writers
Pakistani writers
Pakistani music video directors
Pakistani Muslims
Film directors from Karachi
Writers from Karachi
1976 births